Rankings of universities in Latin America have been published by Quacquarelli Symonds, SCImago and Webometrics.

QS Ranking
New Rankings of Universities have been published by QS World University Rankings 2018/19. (apply filter by location "Latin America")

SCImago Institutions Rankings (2016)
Rankings of institutions in Latin America have been published by SCImago for the year 2016.

Times Higher Education (2015/2016)
Rankings of universities including those in  Latin America have been published by Times Higher Education Rankings 2018

See also
 List of colonial universities in Latin America

References

University and college rankings
Latin America-related lists